In the 2011–12 season, MC Alger competed in the Ligue 1 for the 41st season, as well as the Champions League, and the Algerian Cup. It was their 9th consecutive season in the top flight of Algerian football.

Squad list
Players and squad numbers last updated on 18 November 2010.Note: Flags indicate national team as has been defined under FIFA eligibility rules. Players may hold more than one non-FIFA nationality.

Competitions

Overview

{| class="wikitable" style="text-align: center"
|-
!rowspan=2|Competition
!colspan=8|Record
!rowspan=2|Started round
!rowspan=2|Final position / round
!rowspan=2|First match	
!rowspan=2|Last match
|-
!
!
!
!
!
!
!
!
|-
| Ligue 1

|  
| 13th
| 6 September 2011
| 21 May 2012
|-
| Algerian Cup

| Round of 64 
| Round of 16
| 30 December 2011
| 10 March 2012
|-
| Champions League

| colspan=2| Group stage 
| 16 July 2011
| 16 September 2011
|-
! Total

Ligue 1

League table

Results summary

Results by round

Matches

Algerian Cup

Champions League

Group B

Matches

Squad information

Playing statistics

|-

|-
! colspan=12 style=background:#dcdcdc; text-align:center| Players transferred out during the season

Goalscorers

Transfers

In

Out

References

MC Alger seasons
Algerian football clubs 2011–12 season